Steven Dillon may refer to:
 Steve Dillon (1962–2016), British comic book artist
 Steve Dillon (baseball) (born 1943), American baseball player
 Steven Dillon (writer and professor), American author and Professor of English at Bates College in Lewiston, Maine

See also
 Stephen Dillane (born 1957), English actor